Florencia Airport  is an airstrip  south-southeast of San Lorenzo in the pampa of Beni Department in Bolivia.

There are no paved roads into the airstrip.

See also

Transport in Bolivia
List of airports in Bolivia

References

External links 
OurAirports - Florencia
Fallingrain - Florencia Airport
HERE/Nokia - Florencia

Airports in Beni Department